David "Brendan" Coyle (born 2 December 1962) is a British-Irish actor. He won the Olivier Award for Best Performance in a Supporting Role for The Weir in 1999. He also played Nicholas Higgins in the miniseries North & South, Robert Timmins in the first three series of Lark Rise to Candleford, and more recently Mr Bates, the valet, in Downton Abbey, which earned him a nomination for a Primetime Emmy Award for Outstanding Supporting Actor in a Drama Series and a BAFTA nomination for Best Supporting Actor

Early life
Brendan Coyle was born David Coyle in Corby on 2 December 1962, the son of a Scottish mother and Irish father. He has an older brother named Shaun, who works as a butcher. Due to his British birth and Irish heritage, he holds both British and Irish citizenship. He is the great-nephew of football manager Sir Matt Busby. He studied drama in Dublin in 1981 and received a scholarship to Mountview Academy of Theatre Arts in London in 1983.

Career
Coyle received a Laurence Olivier Award in 1999 for his performance in Conor McPherson's The Weir and won a New York Critics Theater World Award for Outstanding Broadway Debut for the same play in its New York production. In 2001, Coyle appeared in the film Conspiracy as Gestapo Chief Heinrich Müller. He played Kaz Sweeney in the British drama, True Dare Kiss, and Nicholas Higgins in North & South for the BBC.

From 2008 he played Robert Timmins in three BBC series based on the Lark Rise to Candleford novels, written by Flora Thompson. In 2010, he began playing John Bates, valet and former British Army batman to the Earl of Grantham in Julian Fellowes's period drama series, Downton Abbey. Fellowes wrote the part for Coyle, and it won him nominations for a BAFTA and IFTA, as well as a nomination for the Primetime Emmy Awards as Outstanding Supporting Actor in a Drama Series in 2012. He also won three Screen Actors Guild Awards 2013–16. Coyle also played the character of Terry Starling in the short-lived Sky comedy series Starlings.

Personal life
Coyle divides his time between London and Norfolk. He is a fan of the football team Manchester United FC, which was famously managed by his great-uncle Matt Busby.

Filmography

Film

Television

Anderson Shelter Productions
In July 2014, Brendan Coyle and Joy Harrison formed Anderson Shelter Productions Limited with the mission to "find talented young filmmakers" and assist in funding their short film projects. On 14 September 2014, Coyle announced via Twitter his involvement with Council Child Production's short film, Starcross.

References

External links 
Brendan Coyle Fansite
 

1962 births
Alumni of the Mountview Academy of Theatre Arts
English male film actors
English people of Irish descent
English people of Scottish descent
English male stage actors
English male television actors
Living people
People from Corby
Actors from Northamptonshire
Laurence Olivier Award winners
20th-century English male actors
21st-century English male actors
Theatre World Award winners
People from Heacham